Melipotis euryphaea is a species of moth in the family Erebidae. It is found in Belize.

References

Moths described in 1926
Melipotis